Gazzetta di Modena is a morning daily newspaper that serves the city of Modena and its similarly named province in Italy.

History and profile
Gazzetta di Modena was established in 1981. It is part of the Gruppo Editoriale L'Espresso media conglomerate. The paper is based in Modena and is published by Finegal Editoriale S.P.A. Gazzetta di Modena has an independent political stance.

References

External links
Official Website of Gazzetta di Modena

1981 establishments in Italy
Daily newspapers published in Italy
Italian-language newspapers
Mass media in Modena
Newspapers established in 1981